Secret Story (season 1) or Secret Story 1 is the first season of various versions of television show Secret Story and may refer to:

 Secret Story (French season 1), the 2007 edition of the French version.
 Secret Story 1 (Portugal), the 2010 edition of the Portuguese version.
 Secret Story (Dutch TV series), the 2011 edition of the Dutch version.
 La casa de los secretos, the 2012 edition of the Peruvian version.
 Paslapčių namai, the 2013 edition of the Lithuanian version.